Maicon Souza de Jesus (born 28 July 1989) is a Brazilian association footballer who currently plays as a midfielder for Limeira.

Career
Souza had played for Rio Claro Futebol Clube before being sent out on loan to Montedio Yamagata for the 2011 J. League Division 1 season.

References

External links
 
 
 

1989 births
Living people
Brazilian footballers
União São João Esporte Clube players
Sport Club Internacional players
Rio Claro Futebol Clube players
Clube Atlético Bragantino players
Montedio Yamagata players
FC Slovan Liberec players
S.C. Braga players
J1 League players
Czech First League players
Brazilian expatriate footballers
Expatriate footballers in Japan
Expatriate footballers in the Czech Republic
Expatriate footballers in Portugal
Brazilian expatriate sportspeople in Japan
Brazilian expatriate sportspeople in the Czech Republic
Association football midfielders